Jamie Holmes (born April 4, 1983 in Jacksonville, Florida) is an  American soccer player. He concluded his career playing for Real Maryland Monarchs in the USL Second Division.

Career

College
Holmes played college soccer at Birmingham Southern College from 2001 to 2004.

Professional
Holmes was drafted in the second round (seventeenth overall) in the 2005 MLS Supplemental Draft by New England Revolution, but despite featuring heavily for the Revs in the MLS Reserve Division, played just one game in Major League Soccer - a 1–1 tie with the Kansas City Wizards on June 4, 2005 - before being waived on on November 16, 2005. He appears not to have played professionally in 2006.

In the spring of 2007, Holmes signed with the Wilmington Hammerheads of the USL Second Division, and spent two years playing with the team. He had two loan spells in the USL First Division - one in July 2007 with the Rochester Rhinos, and one in August 2008 with the Charleston Battery, before signing with the Real Maryland Monarchs in 2009.

References

External links
Real Maryland Monarchs profile
Wilmington Hammerheads profile

1983 births
Living people
American soccer players
Charleston Battery players
Major League Soccer players
New England Revolution players
Wilmington Hammerheads FC players
USL Second Division players
USL First Division players
Real Maryland F.C. players
Rochester New York FC players
New England Revolution draft picks
Association football forwards